Phytocoris varipes is a species of plant bugs belonging to the family Miridae, subfamily Mirinae.

Description
The species is pinkish-brown to red-brown in colour. and have longitudinal markings on its upper surface.

Distribution
Europe but it is mainly absent from Andorra, Azores, Canary Islands, Cyprus, Faroe Islands, Finland, Iceland, Latvia, Liechtenstein, Lithuania,  Madeira, Malta, Poland, and central and southern part of Russia. then east to the Caucasus and Iran.It is present in the U.S.A. (Oregon) as an adventive species.

Biology
Adults and nymphs live on various herbaceous plants and grasses and suck especially on the flowers and immature fruits. They are zoophytophagous, possibly predominantly phytophagous. Potential host plants include various daisy family (Asteraceae) such as Achillea , Centaurea , Matricaria  and Artemisia, legumes (Fabaceae) such as Trifolium, Ononis,  Lathyrus, Cytisus scoparius  and also Rumex   from the family Polygonaceae,  Galium  (Rubiaceae) (Poaceae) including  Phleum  and Bromus  .  Oviposition has so far been observed on the stems of Achillea millefolium .  The adult bugs occur from the beginning of June.  Mating and oviposition occurs in July and August, and the imagines die in the course of October.

References

External links
 Phytocoris varipes

Insects described in 1852
Hemiptera of Europe
Phytocoris
Taxa named by Carl Henrik Boheman